Charles M. Tanner (April 11, 1919 – March 11, 2006) was a screenwriter, playwright and founder and director of Covenant Players. Tanner turned away from his then passionate love - film production as a writer, producer and director in Hollywood, known for being a writer for Bonanza - to begin Covenant Players in 1963. Besides being chief executive officer, he wrote more than 3,000 plays for the company.

External links
 Covenant Players

1919 births
2006 deaths
20th-century American dramatists and playwrights
American male screenwriters
People from Cattaraugus County, New York
American male dramatists and playwrights
20th-century American male writers
Screenwriters from New York (state)
20th-century American screenwriters